Ae Kaash Ke Hum is a 2020 Indian romantic film directed by Vishal Mishra. The film stars Vivaan Shah, Priya Singh and Sophia Singh in the lead roles. The film revolves around campus friendship and romance of three youngsters and has a very authentic nostalgic feel of 90's. The film was shot in Dharamshala, Himachal Pradesh in 2019. The film was earlier titled as, Abhi Na Jao Chhod Kar.

The film is produced by Kiran K Talasila and co-produced by late Pankaj Thalore. It was released in cinemas on 17 January 2020.

Synopsis 
Ae Kaash Ke Hum is the story of three youngsters and their love, friendship and fate. Pari is a girl who falls in love with her classmate, Ayush but by the time she expresses her love, it's already too late. The fate takes her love away and when it comes back, the life has already taken a turn for the worst.

Cast
 Vivaan Shah as Ayush
 Priya Singh as Pari
 Sophiya Singh as Sania

Soundtrack

Reception

References

External links
 

Hindi-language romance films
2020 films
2020s Hindi-language films
Indian teen romance films
Films shot in Himachal Pradesh
2020s teen romance films
2020 romance films